NK Osijek entered the into 2008-09 Season defending third position, which is equal to their best position in Prva HNL won six times since Croatian independence. The team decided not to participate in the UEFA Intertoto Cup which would make preparations for the new season harder than usual, as happened two years ago.

To prepare for the Season, NK Osijek played a few friendly matches against 1. FC Kaiserslautern and FC Fehérvár to name a few. The new season will start with the same manager as last year, and with just Milan Pavličić sold from last years starting eleven. As the club's youth academy is one of the best in this part of Europe, several young players are drafted into the first team squad.

Fans and board of directors are hoping that this season can repeat last one, to put NK Osijek into UEFA cups next season.

Kit

|
|

Player statistics

Matches

Prva HNL

Standings

Osijek
2008